Heather C. Asch (born May 28, 1966) is an American puppeteer.

Biography
Heather Asch, who hails from Minneapolis, graduated from the University of Connecticut's Puppet Arts Program in 1991. Her first puppet project is Bosum Buddies which deals with the topic on breast cancer. Asch also works at Jim Kroupa's puppet workshop called 3/Design which was responsible for creating puppets for The Great Space Coaster and Eureeka's Castle. In addition to her works for The Jim Henson Company and Sesame Workshop, she is also an executive director and producer of No Strings Productions which was established by Kathryn Mullen and Michael K. Frith.

Filmography

Television
 Allegra's Window - Vi, Aria, Grandma, Jingle
 Bear in the Big Blue House - Various
 Between the Lions - Click the Mouse, Clay the Pigeon, Marmy, Various
 Blue's Room - Grandma Roary
 LazyTown - Trixie (Defeeted, Sports Day & Lazy Scouts Only)
 My Little Pony: Make Your Mark - Sparky (Voice)
 It's a Big Big World - Additional puppeteer
 Johnny and the Sprites - Root, Various Fuzzies
 Nick Jr. - Pinky, Lefty ("Play Along" segments)
 Once Upon a Tree - Amber the Bear, Rhapsody the Toad
 Oobi - Moppie
 Sesame Street - Hansel (2006), Additional Muppets
 The Wubbulous World of Dr. Seuss - Sneels, 
Ariana

Film
 A Muppets Christmas: Letters to Santa - Additional Muppets

Crew work
 The Muppet Christmas Carol - Puppet Builder
 Animal Jam - Puppet Builder, Puppet Wrangler
 Bear in the Big Blue House - Fill-In Puppet Wrangler
 Between the Lions - Puppet Builder, Puppet Wrangler
 CityKids - Puppet Builder
 Jim Henson's Pajanimals - Puppet Builder
 Johnny and the Sprites - Puppet Builder
 Kermit's Swamp Years - Puppet Builder, Puppet Wrangler
 Muppet Treasure Island - Puppet Builder
 Muppets Tonight - Puppet Builder
 Once Upon a Tree - Puppet Builder, Puppet Wrangler
 Sesame Street - Photo Stylist, Puppet Builder, Puppet Wrangler
 The Secret Life of Toys - Puppet Builder
 The Wubbulous World of Dr. Seuss - Puppet Builder, Puppet Supervisor

References

External links
 Official Website

American puppeteers
Muppet performers
Sesame Street Muppeteers
1966 births
Living people